HUGO (High capacity, Undersea Guernsey Optical-fibre) is a submarine telecommunications cable linking the United Kingdom, the Channel Islands, and France.

It has landing points in:

Porthcurno, Cornwall, England, the United Kingdom
Pembroke, Vale Parish, Guernsey, the Channel Islands
Saints Bay, St Martin Parish, Guernsey, the Channel Islands
Lannion, Côtes-d'Armor, Brittany, France

HUGO East, a separate cable system, includes a direct connection between Jersey and France, and another to Guernsey. HUGO East makes use of the fibre optics within the cable that supplies both Jersey and Guernsey with power.

In November 2016 a ship, possibly an LPG tanker the "King Arthur", dragging an anchor cut all three communication cables connecting Guernsey to England, just north of Alderney. All Channel Island communications were diverted to using the CIEG and HUGO East connections to France.

References

Submarine communications cables in the English Channel
France–United Kingdom relations